The following is a list of gods and goddesses from Efik mythology.

Supreme being
The Supreme God is known as Abasi. He is regarded as the father of all things.

Ndem

National deities
  - One of the most popular cults in the lower Cross river region. Ekpenyong is regarded as the custodian of Nsibidi.
 Ekanem - Ekanem is often worshipped alongside Ekpenyong but the worship of Ekanem was not as wide-spread as the worship of Ekpenyong.

Communal deities
Communal deities are deities worshipped by a number of Efik families and houses. These deities have no affiliation with specific families but are guardians of the individual towns of Old Calabar.
  - She is regarded as the deity of Obutong. She originally belonged to the Enwang clan. She is believed to reside at the head of a spring or river near the former site of Obutong by the Hope Waddell Training Institute.
  - He is regarded as the deity of Adiabo
  - Anantigha Enwang is a male deity who originally belonged to the Enwang people.
 Sunko Monko - The deity for Nsidung (Henshaw town).
  - Prior to the prominence of Anansa in the religious life of the Efik of Iboku, Afia anwan was believed to be the central deity of the Efik. The Eniong people equally worshipped Afia anwan.
  - Deity of the Effiat people. Worshipped by the Efik and the Effiatt.

Family deities
Some deities were the guardians of specific families and houses in Old Calabar.
  - Worshipped by Etim Efiom house of Old Calabar
  - Worshipped by Etim Efiom house of Old Calabar
  - Worshipped by Etomkpe Yellow Duke house of Old Calabar

Other marine deities
 Asari Mandu - A river goddess located at Ifondo river in Akpabuyo Local Government Area.
 Ebebe - Wife of Ukong Esuk
  - An Efik Ndem Priest who E.U. Aye asserts became part of the host of Ndem Efik.
  - regarded as the deity of wealth who lives at the bottom of the Calabar river.
 Akpando - Deity located at Ikot Esu
  - Deity located at Ikot Esu
 Asari Anyando - Deity located at Creek town
 Esiet obom - Deity located at Creek town
  - Deity located at Creek town
 
 Eka Asari
 Ekarabitiad
 Amia Nkanika
 Oworoba
 
 Ekanem Unan
 
 Ewa Okon
 
 Ifiaya
 
 
 
 Obo Iwomen

Pre-Ndem era deities
 Atai - Atai is believed to be the wife of Abasi. She is regarded as the messenger of Abasi and the goddess of death.
 Obuma - Goddess of thunder

See also
 Efik mythology

References

Bibliography
 
 
 
 
 
 
 
 
 
 
 
 

Efik
Efik mythology